Broadway is a former electoral division in the Canadian province of Manitoba.  It was created in 1989 and eliminated in 1999, with its territory redistributed into the ridings of Wellington, Point Douglas and Fort Rouge.

Many of Broadway's residents were low-income.  Throughout its existence, the riding was represented by Conrad Santos of the New Democratic Party.

List of provincial representatives

Former provincial electoral districts of Manitoba
1989 establishments in Manitoba
1999 disestablishments in Manitoba